Hainanjapyx is a genus of diplurans in the family Japygidae.

Species
 Hainanjapyx jianfengensis Chou, in Chou & Chen 1983
 Hainanjapyx xinlongensis Chou, in Chou & Chen 1983

References

Diplura